Thomas Coventry may refer to:
Thomas Coventry, 1st Baron Coventry (1578–1640), English lawyer, politician and judge
Thomas Coventry, 2nd Baron Coventry (1606–1661), English politician
Thomas Coventry, 1st Earl of Coventry (c. 1629–1699)
Thomas Coventry, 2nd Earl of Coventry (died 1710), English peer
Thomas Henry Coventry, Viscount Deerhurst (1721–1744), British Tory Member of Parliament
Thomas Coventry (cricketer) (1778–1816), English amateur cricketer
Thomas George Coventry (1885–1972), English-born agent and political figure in British Columbia
Thomas Coventry (politician) (c. 1713–1797), British lawyer, financier, and politician

See also
Thomas Coventre (disambiguation)